La Mé Region (also known as Massan Region) is one of the 31 regions of Ivory Coast. Since its establishment in 2011, it has been one of three regions in Lagunes District. The seat of the region is Adzopé and the region's population in the 2021 census was 726,665.

La Mé is currently divided into four departments: Adzopé, Akoupé, Alépé, and Yakassé-Attobrou.

Name
In the 2011 decree that created the region, La Mé was referred to exclusively as the region of "Massan". Since its creation, the region has more commonly been referred to as "La Mé".

Notes

 
Regions of Lagunes District
States and territories established in 2011
2011 establishments in Ivory Coast